David Eccles Nichols (1873, in Holbeck, Yorkshire – 1962, in Aberdeen) was a violist, member of the Verbrugghen String Quartet and the Fellowes String Quartet.

References 

1873 births
1962 deaths
People from Holbeck